Dobrée is a surname. Notable people with the surname include:

 Bonamy Dobrée (1891–1974), professor of English literature at the University of Leeds
 Bonamy Dobrée (banker), governor of the Bank of England from 1859 to 1861
 Georgina Dobrée (1930–2008), English clarinettist
 Louisa Emily Dobrée (fl. ca. 1877–1917), French writer
 Peter Paul Dobrée (1782–1825), English classical scholar and critic
 Valentine Dobrée (1894–1974), visual artist, novelist and poet

See also
 John Dobree Dalgairns (1818–1876), English Roman Catholic priest

See also
 Musée Dobrée, a museum in Nantes, France